Joseph Martin Crowley was a member of the Wisconsin State Assembly.

Biography
Crowley was born on April 29, 1871 in Milwaukee, Wisconsin.

Career
Crowley was elected to the Assembly in 1902. He was Democrat.

References

Politicians from Milwaukee
1871 births
Year of death missing
Democratic Party members of the Wisconsin State Assembly